"Child Is Father of the Man" is a song by American rock band the Beach Boys that was written by Brian Wilson and Van Dyke Parks. It was originally recorded for the band's never-finished album Smile. In 2004, Wilson rerecorded the song for Brian Wilson Presents Smile. In 2011, the Beach Boys' original recording was released on The Smile Sessions.

The title derives from an idiom meaning that man is the product of habits and behavior developed in youth. Surviving tapes of the original recordings do not show any lyrics other than "child is father of the man". Parks penned new words for the 2004 version. The instrumentation includes keyboard, trumpet, vocal rounds, and a droning guitar saturated with reverb. Elements of the song were later reworked for the band's "Little Bird" and "Surf's Up".

Background
"Child is father of the man" is an idiom originating from the poem "My Heart Leaps Up" by William Wordsworth.  There are many different interpretations of the phrase, the most popular of which is that man is the product of habits and behavior developed in youth.  In a late 1966 interview, Brian Wilson remarked, "And another thing that interests me ... who was it, Karl Menninger , who said, 'The child is father of the man'? That fascinates me!"

According to historian Keith Badman, Van Dyke Parks stated that there were lyrics for the song that were never originally recorded. In 2004, Parks told journalist Domenic Priore, "It was an instrumental piece until Brian asked me to put words on it in November of 2003." He said he had originally suggested the idiom to Wilson.

Wilson's 2016 memoir states that "'Child Is Father of the Man' was about mental health and knowing yourself so you could do the right things in the world."

Recording
The instrumental track for "Child Is Father of the Man" was recorded on October 7 ("Version 1") and October 11, 1966 ("Version 2") at Western Studio. The latter was logged as a "Cabin Essence" session. Biographer Jon Stebbins described the track as "a brooding and expansive aura, with a plaintive harmonica  line not dissimilar to those heard on Ennio Morricone Spaghetti Western soundtracks."

Vocals were overdubbed by the group on October 12 and December 2 at Columbia Studio. Band archivist Mark Linett later said that there are vocal parts obscured by Carl Wilson's singing on the track. Linett said, "When he's not singing, you can hear faint background vocal parts that no longer exist on the multitrack. They must have been in his headphones, and were picked up by the vocal mic. It could be that Brian decided he didn't need them, or that he was going to re-record them, but never did. You hear this sort of stuff throughout the tapes."

A mix of "Child Is Father of the Man" was compiled in late 1966 and later released on the 2018 compilation Wake the World: The Friends Sessions. In April 1967, the band revisited the song at Sound Recorders. Brian played grand piano while he and his bandmates sang vocals. The tape was logged as "Tune X" on the box and slated as "Nowhere" on the session tape.

Legacy
In 1968, the song's chorus was rewritten and rerecorded as the chorus for "Little Bird" from Friends.

In 1971, when the band completed "Surf's Up" for their album of the same name, the coda included a reworking of the chorus from "Child Is Father of the Man". Writing in a 1996 online Q&A, band manager Jack Rieley wrote that Brian had "stated clearly that it was his intent all along for Child to be the tag for Surfs Up."

Personnel
Per band archivist Craig Slowinski.

Version 1 (October 7, 1966)

Hal Blaine – drums, overdubbed tambourine
Jimmy Bond – upright bass
Frank Capp – vibraphone
Carol Kaye – Fender bass
Bill Pitman – electric baritone lead guitar
Brian Wilson – grand piano
Carl Wilson – castanet

Version 2 (October 11December 2, 1966)

 Jimmy Bond – upright bass
 Bruce Johnston – vocals
 Al Jardine – vocals
 Carol Kaye – Fender bass
 Mike Love – vocals
 Ollie Mitchell – trumpet
 Bill Pitman – electric baritone lead guitar (chorus and verse)
 Brian Wilson – vocals, tack piano (chorus and verse), grand piano (bridge), overdubbed snare drum in chorus (uncertain credit)
 Carl Wilson – vocals, electric rhythm guitar (verse), overdubbed sleigh bells in chorus (uncertain credit)

Version 3 (circa April 10, 1967)
 Mike Love – vocals
 Al Jardine – vocals
 Brian Wilson – vocals, grand piano
 Carl Wilson – vocals

References
Note

References

External links
 
 
 
 

1966 songs
The Beach Boys songs
Song recordings produced by Brian Wilson
Songs written by Brian Wilson
Songs written by Van Dyke Parks
Songs based on poems
Songs released posthumously
Brian Wilson songs
Songs about mental health